Tariq Ahmed (born 1 January 1981, in Rangpur, Bangladesh) is a first-class cricketer who has played in the National Cricket League in Bangladesh since 2008–09.

A middle-order batsman, he played for Chittagong Division in 2008-09 and Barisal Division in 2010–11, but when the Rangpur Division team was formed in 2011 he returned to Rangpur as captain of the new team. He was not reappointed captain after 2011–12, but has remained with Rangpur Division as a player. His highest score is 102 for Rangpur Division in his last first-class match, against Dhaka Division in 2015–16.

References

External links
 Tariq Ahmed at Cricinfo
 Tariq Ahmed at CricketArchive

1981 births
Living people
Bangladeshi cricketers
Rangpur Division cricketers
Chittagong Division cricketers
Barisal Division cricketers
People from Rangpur District